Zulfiqar (also Zulfikar and other Romanisations) or Dhu al-Fiqar was the legendary sword of the Islamic leader Ali.

Zulfiqar may also refer to:

Weapon
 Zulfiqar (tank), an Iranian-made Main Battle Tank
 PNS Zulfiqar, the name of three ships of the Pakistan navy
 Zolfaghar (missile), an Iranian ballistic missile

People
 Asad Zulfiqar (born 1997), Dutch cricketer
 Saqib Zulfiqar (born 1997), Dutch cricketer
 Sikander Zulfiqar (born 1997), Dutch cricketer
 Ahmed Mourad Bey Zulfikar (1888–1945), Egyptian police commissioner
 Zulfiqar Ahmad Dhillon, Pakistani politician and former Brigadier in the Pakistan Army
 Zulfiqar Ahmed (cricketer, born 1926) (1926–2008), Pakistani cricketer
 Zulfiqar Ahmed (Dutch cricketer) (born 1966), Dutch cricketer
 Zulfiqar Ali, born 1947, East African cricketer, bowler
 Zulfiqar Ali (mayor), born 1965, mayor of Rochdale, UK
 Zulfiqar Ali Bhatti, born 1965, Pakistani politician, Pakistan Muslim League (N)
 Zulfikar Ali Bhutto (1928–1979), former Prime Minister of Pakistan
 Zulfiqar Ali Bukhari (1904–1975), Pakistani broadcaster
 Zulfikar family, an Egyptian family
 Zulfiqar Ali Khan, Pakistan Air Force Chief of Staff
 Dina Zulfikar, born 1962, Egyptian environmentalist
 Zulfiqar Ali Khosa, Pakistani politician and former Governor of Punjab
 Zulfikar Ali Magsi, born 1954, Pakistani politician, Governor of Balochistan Province 
 Zulfiqar Ali Shah Jamote (1941–2011), Pakistani politician, Senator, and leader of the  Pakistan Muslim League (F)
 Zulfiqar Babar, born 1978, Pakistani cricketer, right-handed batsman and left arm spinner
 Zulfikar Ghose, born 1935, Pakistani writer
 Zulfiqar Gilani, Pakistani journalist and author
 Zulfiqar Jan, born 1979, Pakistani cricketer, batsman and wicketkeeper
 Zulfiqar Khan Nusrat Jung (1657–1713), Mughal nobleman
 Ahmed Zulfikar (1952–2010), Egyptian entrepreneur
 Ezz El-Dine Zulficar (1919–1963), Egyptian filmmaker
 Mahmoud Zulfikar (1914–1970), Egyptian filmmaker
 Mikaal Zulfiqar, a Pakistani British actor and model
 Mona Zulficar, Egyptian lawyer
 Zulfiqar Mirza, born 1954, a Pakistani politician affiliated with the Pakistan Peoples Party
 Said Pasha Zulfikar, former Grand Chamberlain of Egypt
 Salah Zulfikar (1926–1993), Egyptian actor and producer
 Zulfiqar Shah, born 1977, Pakistani journalist and civil rights activist
 Zulfiqer Russell, Bangladeshi musicians

Places and settlements
 Zulfiqarabad, a Pakistan development project
 Deh-e Zu ol Faqar, also known as  Deh Zulfiqār, a village in Iran

Organisations
 Al-Zulfiqar, Pakistani leftist insurgent organisation based in Afghanistan
 Shaheed Zulfiqar Ali Bhutto Institute of Science and Technology, a private research university
 Zulficar and Partners, Egyptian law firm
 Zulfikar ltd., Egyptian landscape company
 Order of Zolfaghar, Iranian military order

Items
 Zulfiqar (film), an Indian film
 Bagel